José Alberto dos Reis (November 1, 1875 – December 12, 1955) was a Portuguese jurist and the leading Portuguese authority on legal procedure in the 20th century.

A law professor in Coimbra, Reis held several academic and public offices, including that of member of the Assembleia Nacional in 1934–45. He was the leading redactor and commentator of the 1939 code of civil procedure. Reis's academic writings show an inclination to prefer practical solutions over dated formalisms in issues of legal procedure.

References
 

1875 births
1955 deaths
20th-century Portuguese lawyers
Presidents of the Assembly of the Republic (Portugal)